120 is a 2008 Turkish war film directed by Murat Saraçoğlu and Özhan Eren based on the true story of 120 children who died in 1915 carrying ammunition for the Battle of Sarikamish against the Russians during World War I. The film went on general release across Turkey on  and is one of the highest grossing Turkish films of 2008.

Production
Writer, producer and co-director  Özhan Eren, an expert on the Caucasus Campaign in World War I, who came across the story of the 120 boys while doing the research for his bestselling The Road to Sarıkamış, spent three years preparation for the film.

The film, which received a record amount of support from the Turkish Ministry of Culture and Tourism, was shot over two years in harsh conditions on location in Safranbolu, Van and Istanbul, Turkey. When heavy snow, expected in Van for the winter settings of the film, failed to arrive, 20 trucks, two loaders and 30 staff members had to be laid on to bring 300 tons of snow from Çaldıran to Van for several scenes.

Plot
During the Battle of Sarikamish, the Ottoman army runs out of ammunition and appeals for help to the people of Van, who happen to have supplies. However, the First World War is on and all the men are fighting at the four corners of the empire and therefore can not respond to the appeal. The young children of Van want to do something and when the principal of a school, who has lost a son in the war, suggests that they transport ammunition, 120 young boys aged 12 to 17 volunteer and take to the road. The movie tells the true story of the 120 boys and their sisters and mothers left behind, who wait for their return.

Cast
 Ozge Ozberk
 Burak Sergen
 Cansel Elcin

Release 

Reception

Box office 
The film was in the Turkish box office charts for 41 weeks and is the 9th highest-grossing Turkish film of 2008 with a total nationwide gross of US$3,289,480.

Reviews

References

External links 

 

2008 films
World War I films set in the Middle East
Films set in Turkey
Turkish war films
2000s war films
2000s Turkish-language films